Kingston is an unincorporated community in Des Moines County, Iowa, United States. It is part of the Burlington, IA–IL Micropolitan Statistical Area. Kingston is located along State Highway 99, approximately 15 miles north of Burlington.

Demographics

History
 Kingston is known for its Late Prehistoric Kingston Oneota Site and it is close to the Malchow Mounds State Preserve and the grave of Taimah, a native chieftain.

Kingston was named for its founder, W. King.

References

Unincorporated communities in Iowa
Unincorporated communities in Des Moines County, Iowa
Burlington, Iowa micropolitan area